Paula-Irene Villa Braslavsky (born 1968) is a German-Argentine sociologist. She is a professor of general sociology and gender studies at the Ludwig Maximilian University of Munich (LMU) and president of the German Sociological Association.

Career 
Villa Braslavsky was born in Santiago de Chile and grew up in Argentina until she was eight. She is a daughter of the chemist Silvia Braslavsky and a grandchild of the educator Berta Perelstein de Braslavsky. She moved to Germany with her mother in 1976. She studied social sciences in Bochum and Buenos Aires. She worked at the University of Hanover before she became professor of general sociology and gender studies at LMU. She was director of the Department of Sociology at LMU from 2010 to 2012.

In 2021 she became president of the German Sociological Association. She has served on its board since 2013. She is also a board member of the Gender Studies Association in Germany.

References 

German sociologists
Academic staff of the Ludwig Maximilian University of Munich
1968 births

Living people